"Expression" is a song by American group Salt-N-Pepa, released as the lead single from their third album, Blacks' Magic (1990). The song was both written and produced by member Cheryl "Salt" James. It became the group's second single to reach the top 40 in the United States, peaking at number 28 on the Billboard Hot 100 while also topping the Billboard Hot Rap Singles chart, becoming their first song to do so. The single was certified gold by the Recording Industry Association of America on February 28, 1990, before reaching platinum status less than three months later, on May 25. In 1992 a re-release charted within the top 30 in Ireland and the United Kingdom and peaked at number 13 in France.

The accompanying music video is notable for marking the directorial debut of director Millicent Shelton.

Critical reception
Connie Johnson from Los Angeles Times remarked that "Expression" is written "with a power-to-the-individual emphasis", naming it "one of the wittiest rap tracks to emerge this year." Terry Staunton  from NME wrote, "A bold experiment combining rap and lovers' rock with a built-in tribute to their favourite rappers near the end. This is going to be bloody massive, Top Ten in matter of minutes." Kim France from Spin described it as "a danceable, darn near perfect number that owes more than a touch to Chaka Khan's 84 proto-hip-house hit "I Feel For You"."

Single track listing
 A-side
"Expression" – 4:04
"Expression" (No Shorts mix) – 5:17
"Expression" (Acappella) – 1:16

 B-side
"Expression" (Instrumental) – 4:04
"Expression" (Bonus Beats) – 1:30
"Clubhouse" (Vocal) – 5:29
"Clubhouse" (Instrumental) – 5:29

Charts and certifications

Weekly charts

Certifications

1992 re-release

"Expression" was re-released in 1992 as the first (and only) single from Salt-N-Pepa's remix album, Rapped in Remixes: The Greatest Hits Remixed. The song peaked at number 23 in Ireland and the United Kingdom and number 13 in France.

Track listing
 CD maxi-single
 "Expression"  (Hard Ecu Edit) - 3:59
 "Expression"  (Hard Ecu Full Length) - 6:18
 "Expression"  (House Mix) - 6:18
 "Expression"  (Tear the Roof Off the Sucker) - 5:46

Charts

References

1989 songs
1989 singles
1992 singles
Salt-N-Pepa songs
Next Plateau Entertainment singles